Mount Russell could mean:

 Mount Russell (Alaska), a significant peak of the Alaska Range southwest of Mount McKinley (Denali).
 Mount Russell in the Queen Maud Mountains of Antarctica
 Mount Russell (California), a fourteener in the Sierra Nevada just north of Mount Whitney.
 Mount Russell (Riverside County, California), a mountain in the Perris Block overlooking Lake Perris. 
 Mount Russell (British Columbia), a 1,740 m summit on Vancouver Island.

See also
 Russell Mountain